Gaspar Roberto Domínguez Donoso (born 27 October 1988) is a Chilean physician who was elected as a member of the Chilean Constitutional Convention.

References

External links
 

Living people
1988 births
21st-century Chilean politicians
Non-Neutral Independents politicians
University of Chile alumni
Members of the Chilean Constitutional Convention
People from Santiago
Chilean LGBT politicians
Chilean gay men
Gay politicians